Skipper John's Cook is a 1951 picture book written and illustrated by Marcia Brown. The story tells of a boy who is a cook on a boat. The book was a recipient of a 1952 Caldecott Honor for its illustrations.

References

1951 children's books
American picture books
Caldecott Honor-winning works